The Atlanta Speech School is a language and literacy school located in Atlanta, Georgia, established in 1938. The school provides educational and clinical programs. The Atlanta Speech School's Rollins Center provides professional development for teachers and educators in partner schools and preschools. The Rollins Center focuses on the eradication of illiteracy. The Rollins Center has an online presence called Cox Campus, which is an online learning environment with coursework targeted for the education of children age 0–8.

The four schools of the Atlanta Speech School are the Katherine Hamm Center, the Wardlaw School, Stepping Stones Preschool, and the Anne & Jim Kenan Preschool. The Clinic at Atlanta Speech School provides clinical services in Speech and Language Pathology, Audiology, and The Learning Lab for academic support and Occupational Therapy.

School programs

Katherine Hamm Center
The Katherine Hamm Center offers auditory-verbal education for children ages 0 to 5 who are deaf or hard of hearing. The goal of auditory-verbal programs is to enable students to communicate using listening and oral language rather than sign language. Students enrolled in the Katherine Hamm Center use assisted listening devices such as cochlear implants and hearing aids and are prepared for mainstream classroom environments. The majority of students leaving the Hamm Center are mainstreamed into regular public and independent schools.  The Katherine Hamm center has accreditations from Bright from the Start,  OPTION schools, and Georgia Accrediting Commission (GAC).

Wardlaw School
The Wardlaw School enrolls elementary-age students with dyslexia. Instructors use a collaborative teaching model to provide individualized instruction for each student. The Wardlaw School is designed to be a short term learning environment, and has the goal of preparing students for a mainstream educational environment. The Wardlaw School is accredited by the Georgia Accrediting Commission (GAC).

Stepping Stones
Stepping Stones is a program that provides speech therapy for children ages 3–4 who may have developmental delays related to speech and language. The curriculum addresses student needs in regards to speech, language, and multisensory integration. Instructional teams consist of a speech-language pathologist, learning disability specialist, occupational therapist, and teacher assistant. The Stepping Stones program is accredited by Bright from the Start and the Georgia Accrediting Commission (GAC).

Anne & Jim Kenan Preschool
The Anne & Jim Kenan Preschool is a mainstream preschool program that serves children two to five years of age. It was established to transition student in the Atlanta Speech School's Katherine Hamm Center who are deaf or hard of hearing to mainstream schools. The program has a strong emphasis on oral language (oralism).

Clinical and community programs
The Atlanta Speech School Clinics provide communication and literacy education. Atlanta Speech School Clinic clients range in age from infancy to late adulthood, and include members of the metro Atlanta and the state of Georgia community, as well as Atlanta Speech School students.

Speech-Language Pathology & Audiology Clinic
The Atlanta Speech School's Speech-Language Pathology & Audiology Clinic provides evaluation and therapy for children and adults with speech, language and hearing difficulties. The Clinic serves as a referral source for Georgia's Universal Newborn Hearing Screening program and dispenses hearing aids for infants. The Hanen Program for parents of children with language delays is offered through the clinic. Therapists in the clinic also perform speech and hearing screenings for independent schools in the metro Atlanta area.

Therapy is available to treat persons with speech or language difficulties related to the following:
 Accent
 Aphasia
 Apraxia of Speech
 Articulation Disorders
 Auditory Processing Disorders
 Aural Habilitation/Auditory Training
 Cleft Palate
 Hearing Loss
 Phonological Disorders
 Phonological Processing Skills
 Spoken and Written Language Delays
 Stuttering
 Voice Disorders
 Word Retrieval/ Word Finding Difficulties

Services Provided:
 Diagnostic testing, evaluation and remediation
 Hearing evaluations, aural rehabilitation guidance
 Auditory Processing Disorder (APD) testing
 Hearing aid dispensing, programming and service
 Non-medical support prior to and following cochlear implantation

Occupational Therapy Clinic
The Atlanta Speech School's Occupational Therapy Clinic serves children who experience difficulties in sensory integration, gross and fine motor coordination, visual-motor and handwriting skills, visual perception, independent self care, and feeding skills.

Services Provided:
 Diagnostic evaluations
 Intervention services
 Parent/teacher consultation

Learning Lab
The Atlanta Speech School's Learning Lab is an individual or small group intervention program that serves individuals age four through college-age needing assistance to achieve academic success. Lab instructors use formal (standardized achievement) and non-formal (teacher-developed) assessment data to monitor progress. Upon request, instructors may consult with the student's teacher(s) or other professionals.

Academic Areas Served:
 Reading (decoding, comprehension, fluency)
 Written expression
 Language abilities
 Mathematics
 Organizational/Study skills

Rollins Center for Language & Literacy
The Atlanta Speech School's professional development program is funded in part by the O. Wayne Rollins Foundation.

Financial Aid
The Atlanta Speech School offers financial aid programs to clients in need, with costs covered by donors. Financial Aid is not available for the Anne & Jim Kenan Preschool.

References

Special schools in the United States
Education in Atlanta
Educational institutions established in 1938
1938 establishments in Georgia (U.S. state)